David Vincent may refer to:

 David Vincent (musician) (born 1965), American musician
 David Vincent (voice actor) (born 1972), American voice actor
 David W. Vincent (1949–2017), American baseball scorer

See also
 David Vicente (born 1999), Spanish footballer